Pops is a nickname for:

 Louis Armstrong (1901–1971), American jazz musician
 Henry Beasley (1876–1949), British Army lieutenant colonel and early contract bridge player
 Clarence Coleman (baseball) (1884-?), African-American baseball catcher in the pre-Negro leagues
 Pops Fernandez (born 1966), Filipino singer
 Pops Foster (1892–1969), American jazz musician
 Berry Gordy, Sr. (1888–1978), American businessman
 Stan Heal (1920–2010), Australian footballer and politician
 Emmett Johns (1928-2018), Canadian priest and humanitarian
 Fred T. Long (1896–1966), American Negro league baseball player and college football coach
 Lonnie Lynn (1943–2014), American basketball player
 Pops Mensah-Bonsu (born 1983), British basketball player
 Pops Mohamed (born 1949), South African jazz musician
 Pops Staples (1914–2000), American gospel and R&B musician
 Willie Stargell (1940–2001), American Major League Baseball player
 Pops Yoshimura (1922–1995), Japanese motorcycle tuner and race team owner

See also
 Pop (nickname)
 Dad (nickname)
 Daddy (nickname)
 Papa (nickname)
 Pappy

Lists of people by nickname
Nicknames
Nicknames in music